
Year 913 (CMXIII) was a common year starting on Friday (link will display the full calendar) of the Julian calendar.

Events 
 By place 

 Byzantine Empire 
 June 6 – Emperor Alexander III dies of exhaustion while playing the game tzykanion (Byzantine name for polo). He is succeeded by his 8-year-old nephew Constantine VII Porphyrogennetos ("born in the purple"), a son of the late emperor Leo VI (the Wise). The government is administered by a regency council composed of Constantine's mother, Empress Zoe Karbonopsina, Patriarch Nicholas Mystikos and his guardian John Eladas.
 August – Byzantine–Bulgarian War: Simeon I (the Great), ruler (knyaz) of the Bulgarian Empire, launches a campaign at the head of a large Bulgarian army, and reaches Constantinople unopposed. The Bulgarians besiege the Byzantine capital and construct ditches from the Golden Horn to the Golden Gate at the Marmara Sea. After negotiations the siege is lifted and Simeon is recognised as emperor of the Bulgarians.
 Summer – Constantine Doukas, a Byzantine general (magister militum), tries, unsuccessfully, with the support of several aristocrats to usurp the throne from the young Constantine VII. He is killed in a clash by the soldiers of the Hetaireia guard, assembled by John Eladas. His head is cut off and presented to Constantine.

 Europe 
 Battle of the Inn: The Hungarians invade Bavaria, Swabia and Northern Burgundy. At their return they face the combined armies of Arnulf (duke of Bavaria), Erchanger and Burchard II (dukes of Swabia), who defeat them at Aschbach near the Inn River (modern Germany).

 Britain 
 King Edward the Elder begins with the 'reconquest' of the Danelaw and occupies Essex. Death of High-Reeve Eadwulf II. He is succeeded by his son Ealdred I, who is almost immediately driven out by King Ragnall ua Ímair of Norse York. Ealdred flees to the court of King Constantine II of Scotland.

 Arabian Empire 
 Caliph Abdullah al-Mahdi Billah of the Fatimid Caliphate replaces the unpopular governor Ibn Abi Khinzir with Ali ibn Umar al-Balawi. But the Sicilian lords find this unacceptable and decide to declare independence of Sicily. They acknowledge allegiance to the Abbasid caliph Al-Muqtadir and acclaim an Aghlabid prince, Ahmed ibn Khorob, as emir of Sicily. The Sicilians re-launch their conquest of Byzantine Calabria, while Ahmed ibn Khorob in Sicily leads a successful assault against the North African cities of Sfax and Tripoli.

 By topic 

 Religion 
 Summer – Pope Anastasius III dies at Rome after a 2-year reign. He is succeeded by Lando as the 121st pope of the Catholic Church.
 San Miguel de Escalada is built in León (Northern Spain) by orders of King García I (approximate date).

Births 
 al-Mansur bi-Nasr Allah, Fatimid caliph (d. 953)
 Gerberga, Frankish queen and regent (approximate date)
 Shabbethai Donnolo, Jewish physician (d. 982)
 Theobald I, Frankish nobleman (d. 975)
 Wu Hanyue, Chinese noblewoman (d. 952)

Deaths 
 March 27 
 Du Xiao, chancellor of Later Liang 
 Zhang, empress of Later Liang
 May 15 – Hatto I, archbishop of Mainz
 June 6 – Alexander III, Byzantine emperor (b. 870)
 June/July – Abu Sa'id al-Jannabi, founder of the Qarmatian state in Bahrayn (assassinated)
 August 21 – Tang Daoxi, Chinese general 
 Anastasius III, pope of the Catholic Church
 Cheng Ji, Chinese general and strategist
 Constantine Doukas, Byzantine general
 Eadwulf II, ruler (high-reeve) of Northumbria
 Li Yantu, ruler of Qian Prefecture
 Torpaid mac Taicthech, Irish poet
 Ubaydallah ibn Abdallah, Tahirid governor 
 Wang Yuanying, Chinese prince (b. 892)
 Zhu Yougui, emperor of Later Liang

References